This article describes the background of the Russo-Georgian War.

Participants and their interests

Georgia

First polity in the territory of modern day Autonomous Republic of Abkhazia was Georgian Kingdom of Colchis, after the fall of Colchis, another Georgian Kingdom of Egris-Lazika is formed. After the weakening of Egris-Lazika, consisting tribes such as Sanigs(Georgian tribe, ancestor of Mingrelians or Svans), Misimians(Georgian tribe, ancestor of Svans) and Apsilaes(Northwest Caucasian tribe, inhabiting North of Abkhazia) create a unification and call themselves Apkhazebi(Abkhazians), in its core word Abkhazia is of Kartvelian origin, meaning shoulder(which is logical, because Abkhazia is located on the shoulder side of the Georgia) the principality of Abkhazia was ethnically and culturally dominated by Georgians, which later expanded over western Georgia, and became the Kingdom of Abkhazia, whose capital was in Kutaisi. The Abkhaz kingdom led the expansionist policy and soon enlarged its realm to the east. In 978, the Kingdom of Abkhazia and the Kingdom of Georgia unified through dynastic succession. The unification of Georgia was completed when the Emirate of Tbilisi was incorporated into Georgia, and became its capital in 1122. However, after the Mongol invasions, Georgia eventually was broken up into several principalities. In 1801, the east Georgian kingdom was annexed by the Russian Empire and became the Tiflis Governorate. The regions of western Georgia (including Abkhazia) were incorporated into Kutaisi Governorate. After the Russian Revolution of 1917, Georgia declared its independence on 26 May 1918. Although its independence was recognized by Russia in May 1920, the Russian Bolsheviks invaded independent Georgia in 1921.

Georgia had three autonomous territories in Soviet times: Abkhazia, Adjara, and South Ossetia. Only with Adjara, populated by Muslim Georgians, was there a pronounced religious difference. However, Adjarians and other Georgians share a common language and in fact many common elements of identity with the exception of religion. This seems to have been a factor in the prevention of the escalation of conflict between Tbilisi and Batumi. On the other hand, South Ossetians and the majority of Abkhaz are Orthodox Christians, whereas all the other determinants of ethnic identity separated them from the Georgians. Despite this fact, the conflicts between the Georgian central government and these territories were severe and violent.

South Ossetia
The Ossetians are an Indo-European ethnic group descended from the Alans, one of the Sarmatian tribes, and speaking the Ossetian language which is an Iranian language similar to the Pathan language spoken in Afghanistan. The timing of the Ossetian arrival in the South Caucasus is debated. One recent theory holds that they settled there during the 13th and 14th Centuries AD after being driven there by Mongol invaders and Timur's armies.

Historically, Ossetians and Georgians have lived together more or less peacefully and often intermarrying. When the Ossetians first came into contact with Tsarist Russia, geography and religion have since given the Ossetians a pro-Russian orientation. Ossetians joined both the tsarist and Soviet army massively; they take pride in having produced more heroes of the Soviet Union per head of population than other Soviet peoples.

The Soviet Georgian government, established after the Red Army invasion of Georgia in 1921, created the South Ossetian Autonomous Oblast in April 1922 under pressure from Kavburo (the Caucasian Bureau of the Central Committee of the Russian Communist Party). Some historians believe that autonomy was granted to the Ossetians by the Bolsheviks in return for their assistance in fighting against independent Georgia, since this territory had never been a separate entity. Ossetians moved in large numbers to Tskhinvali, which used to have a larger population of Jews and Armenians than of Ossetians. North and South Ossetia were linked for the first time only in 1985 when the Roki Tunnel was opened.

South Ossetians and Georgians lived side by side for centuries without extensive friction. However, during the Soviet time, the region preferred to interact with the Soviet leadership in Moscow and lacked personal ties to the Georgian leadership. Within South Ossetia, Georgian and Ossetian villages were mixed. Around 65 thousand Ossetians lived in South Ossetia, while 100 thousand lived in Georgia proper. Ossetians living in Georgia proper were fluent in the Georgian language, and spoke it better than other minorities living in Georgia. South Ossetia had a Georgian ethnic minority of around 28,500 out of the total population of 98,500 in 1989.

Abkhazia
The Abkhaz are an ethnic group related to the Circassian groups of the North Caucasus. After the Russian Revolution of 1917, Abkhazia shifted between Bolshevik and Menshevik control before finally being conquered by the Bolshevik-controlled Red Army in 1921. In 1922, the Bolsheviks agreed to designate Abkhazia as a treaty republic within the Transcaucasian Socialist Federative Soviet Republic, granting the region considerable autonomy. However, in 1931, Abkhazia was downgraded to the status an autonomous republic within Georgia. After 1936, a severe policy of Georgianization, apparently at Joseph Stalin's whim, was enacted. Most political posts were given to Georgians, and mass immigration of non-Abkhaz peoples ensued, diluting the Abkhaz community to a meager 18% of Abkhazia's overall population by 1939.

The inclusion of Abkhazia as an ASSR within Soviet Georgia in 1931 was seen as illegal act carried out by the "Georgian Stalin" by the Abkhaz. However, the Abkhaz SSR was not the only such entity that was downgraded to an autonomous position. The institution of an Abkhaz SSR would indeed have been an anomaly in Soviet nationality theory, mainly as SSR status was only granted to substantially sized nations with a significant degree of national identity. However, from the perspective of Moscow at the time, the retaining of SSR status of Abkhazia would be prejudicial unless the same status were granted to the national minorities of the North Caucasus. Although the Kremlin might have wanted to weaken Georgia by such a step, it would have potentially grave consequences for Russia itself.

Abkhazia's comparative wealth enabled the Abkhaz people to extract considerable concessions from the Soviet governance. Although the Soviets repeatedly refused to grant Abkhazia separation from Georgia, they did give the Abkhaz increased autonomy and economic credits to improve their infrastructure. During the 1970s the Abkhaz gained increasing control of Abkhazia's administration, the control of ethnic Georgians likewise decreasing, and by the 1980s the Abkhaz filled 67% of the government's minister positions and 71% of the Oblast committee department head positions. Considering that the Abkhaz minority within Abkhazia had by 1989 fallen to just 17.9%, this would indicate that the Abkhaz held a disproportionate share of the high-level administration.

Growing prominence of the Abkhaz people angered Georgians living in Abkhazia who claimed they were being denied privileges. This rift precipitated the so-called "ethnic battles" of the 1970s and 80s which, although fought between different ethnic groups, were largely economic in nature. The Abkhaz viewed the Georgians as would-be defectors from the Soviet Union, whereas the Georgians criticized the Abkhaz for supporting the Soviet Union. The other ethnic groups living in Abkhazia tended to prefer maintaining the status quo, and thereby the Soviet Union, and thus tacitly supported the Abkhaz factions.

Russia
Historically, the Caucasus has been an area over which empires have competed; it has served both as bridge and barrier to contacts between north and south, and between east and west. Its crucial geopolitical location - lying between the regional powers: Russia, Iran, and Turkey - is a "mixed blessing". Russian interests in the region can be viewed as following. The South Caucasus forms a "buffer zone" between the North Caucasus and the Middle East to its South; the region is bordering Turkey and Iran. This is a region where Russia feels "vulnerable". The South Caucasus is also a zone of important economic interests. If the South Caucasus is controlled by Russia, it enables Moscow to control the amount of Western influence in the geopolitically crucial Central Asia. Russia fought two wars in Chechnya to defend its frontier.

Georgia had two strategic characteristics that were seen as irreplaceable in Moscow: the border with Turkey and the location on the Black Sea. Russia is more worried of Turkish than Iranian influence in the Caucasus, and perceives Turkey as a threat in the political, economical and military fields. The Russian ruling elites had focused on Georgia since the days of the presidency of Eduard Shevardnadze, whom they blamed, together with Soviet leader Mikhail Gorbachev, General Secretary of the Communist Party of the Soviet Union, and Alexander Yakovlev,  Secretary of the Central Committee of the Communist Party of the Soviet Union, for the dissolution of the Soviet Union and its sphere of influence. Russian post-Soviet security establishments also viewed the Abkhaz coastline and illicit business opportunities provided by lawless Abkhazia and South Ossetia as additional incentives for deep involvement in Georgia. Of the two regions - Abkhazia and South Ossetia, the first is strategically and economically more significant to Russia. In the 1990s the Russian leadership noted that their strategic weight in the Black Sea depended on the presence of Russian troops on the Black Sea coast of the Caucasus. Russia hoped to use South Ossetia initially to keep Georgia within the Soviet Union and later in a Russian sphere of influence.

Other actors

United States

Building close political ties with Georgia as opposed to the confrontation of the latter with Russia, gave the United States an opportunity to create a counterbalance to Russian dominance in the Caucasus.

Georgia maintained a close relationship with the G.W. Bush administration of the United States of America. In 2002, the USA started the Georgia Train and Equip Program to arm and train the Georgian military, and, in 2005, a Georgia Sustainment and Stability Operations Program to broaden capabilities of the Georgian armed forces to sustain its contribution in the Global War on Terrorism.

Energy routes
Although Georgia has no significant oil or gas reserves of its own, its territory hosts part of the important Baku–Tbilisi–Ceyhan pipeline transit route that supplies Europe. The pipeline transports  of oil per day. Russia, Iran and Persian Gulf countries were against the construction of the BTC pipeline. Operations of the pipeline started up first in Azerbaijan with the beginning of line fill at the head pump station at the Sangachal Terminal on 10 May 2005. It has been a key factor for the United States' support for Georgia, allowing the West to reduce its reliance on Middle Eastern oil while bypassing Russia and Iran.

U.S./Israeli interests in Iran
Russian envoy to NATO Dmitry Rogozin claimed the United States could have plans to use Georgian airfields to launch air strikes against Iranian nuclear facilities. Rogozin said that Russian intelligence had obtained information indicating that Washington had plans to use the Georgian military infrastructure for a war on Iran, stating that the US had already started "active military preparations on Georgia's territory" for such a strike and that the "reason why Washington values Saakashvili's regime so highly" was that he gave permission to the US to use its airfields.

History

Events in South Ossetia

During the collapse of the USSR, Georgia's first post-Soviet leader, Zviad Gamsakhurdia, emerged.

Amidst rising ethnic tensions, war broke out when Georgian forces entered the capital of South Ossetia, Tskhinvali. Military conflict began in January 1991, and urban warfare in Tskhinvali lasted until June 1992. More than 2,000 people are believed to have been killed in the war. The separatists were helped by former Soviet military units, who by now had come under Russian command. Approximately 100,000 Ossetians fled Georgia proper and South Ossetia, while 23,000 Georgians left South Ossetia. A ceasefire agreement (the Sochi Agreement) was reached on 24 June 1992. While it ended the war, it did not deal with the status of South Ossetia. A Joint Control Commission for Georgian–Ossetian Conflict Resolution and peacekeeping force, composed of Russian, Georgian and Ossetian troops, was set up. The Ossetian de facto government controlled the region independently from Tbilisi. The JPKF's activities were mainly concentrated in the Conflict Zone, which included an area within a 15-km radius from Tskhinvali.

The separatists retained control over the districts of Tskhinvali, Java, Znauri and parts of Akhalgori. The Georgian central government controlled the rest of Akhalgori and the Georgian villages in the Tskhinvali district.

Events in Abkhazia

Tensions grew in 1989 when the ethnic Abkhaz population of Abkhazia gathered in the village of Lykhny to declare their demand for separation from Georgia and inclusion in the Russian Federation. Gamsakhurdia's pro-Georgian movement responded with counter-demonstrations of its own, as the region splintered over ethnic ties. On August 25, 1990, the Abkhaz Supreme Soviet declared itself a union republic within the Soviet Union, a move which Tbilisi immediately rejected. The Abkhaz, like the South Ossetians, strongly favoured the continuation of the Soviet Union and distrusted the Georgian leadership; 99% of the Abkhaz voting in the referendum voted in favor of maintaining the Soviet Union in March 1991.

In August 1992, war broke out when the Georgian National Guard entered Abkhazia to rescue captive Georgian officials and to reopen the railway line. Georgian soldiers marched straight to Sukhumi and seized government buildings and looted the city. Eduard Shevardnadze, Georgia's leader, was reluctant to condemn the national guard's commander, Tengiz Kitovani, who allegedly led the incursion into Sukhumi unauthorized. For the Georgian government, far more was at stake in Abkhazia than in South Ossetia: a quarter of a million ethnic Georgians, a large part of territory, most of the Georgian Black Sea coastline - in addition to a great deal of pride and historical attachment. Russian military assisted the Abkhaz separatists. The war lasted until Russia negotiated a ceasefire in July 1993 with the Sochi Agreement. However, the ceasefire was broken in September of that year as the Abkhaz stormed and overwhelmed Sukhumi, which fell on 27 September. Most members of the Georgian government that had stayed in the parliament building, were killed. Following a process of ethnic cleansing of Georgians, the population of Abkhazia was reduced to 216,000, from 525,000 in 1989. On 4 April 1994, the Declaration on Measures for a Political Settlement of the Georgian-Abkhaz Conflict was signed, and one month later a CIS peacekeeping force was deployed in the region. Later, the United Nations Observer Mission in Georgia (UNOMIG) deployed its observers in the south of Abkhazia.

Similar to South Ossetia, an unrecognised government did not control the entire territory of Abkhazia.

Unresolved conflicts
Since the 1990s, the situation in Georgia was monitored by the Organization for Security and Co-operation in Europe mission in Georgia.

The conflict remained frozen until 2004, when Mikheil Saakashvili came to power after Georgia's Rose Revolution, which ousted president Eduard Shevardnadze. In the years that followed, Saakashvili's government pushed a programme to strengthen state institutions, and created "passably democratic institutions" and implemented what was viewed as a pro-US foreign policy. One of Saakashvili's main goals was Georgian NATO membership, which Russia opposed. This has been one of the main stumbling blocks in Georgia-Russia relations.

Restoring South Ossetia and Abkhazia to Georgian control had been a top-priority goal of Saakashvili since he came to power. Saakashvili's relations with Russia deteriorated as he quickly re-established control over Adjara and declared his intention to reintegrate Abkhazia and South Ossetia. Emboldened by the success in restoring control in Adjara in early 2004, the Georgian government launched a push to retake South Ossetia. Intense fighting took place between Georgian forces and South Ossetian militia between 8 and 19 August 2004.

Since 2006, Georgia's total military spending as percentage of GDP was higher than Russia's. According to the 2007 report of Stockholm International Peace Research Institute (SIPRI), Georgia had the highest average growth rate of military spending in the world. Tbilisi stated that it was not aimed at the breakaway regions of Abkhazia and South Ossetia. According to the 2008 budget of Georgia, defence funding accounted for slightly over 19% of all state spending, with a further significant increase approved in an parliament session on 15 July 2008.

From 2005 to 2008, Georgia has repeatedly proposed broad autonomy for Abkhazia and South Ossetia within the unified Georgian state, but the proposals were rejected by the secessionist authorities, who demanded full independence. In 2006 Georgia sent security forces to the Kodori Gorge in eastern Abkhazia, when a local militia leader rebelled against the Georgian authorities. The presence of Georgian forces in the Kodori Gorge continued until the war in 2008.

In July 2006, the Georgian parliament passed a resolution demanding the removal of all Russian peacekeeping forces from Abkhazia, but the forces did not withdraw. In 2007, the Georgian government set up what Russians said was a "puppet government" led by the former South Ossetian prime minister Dmitry Sanakoyev and granted to it a status of a provisional administration, alarming Tskhinvali and Moscow. In what Sergei Markedonov has described as the culmination of Georgian "unfreezing" policy, the control of the Georgian peacekeeping battalion was transferred from the joint command of the peacekeeping forces to the Georgian Defence Ministry.

President Saakashvili promised to bring the breakaway regions back under Georgian control during his re-election campaign in 2008.

Georgia's NATO aspirations
In 1994, Georgia joined the Partnership for Peace, a NATO program. In November 2002, Georgia declared before the NATO Summit in Prague that it intended to secure membership in NATO and sought an Individual Partnership Action Plan (IPAP). However, to join NATO, Georgia was required to update its military to the organization's standards. To perform such reforms, it was estimated that Georgia had to increase its military spending to 2% of its GDP. After Georgia's Rose Revolution in 2003, the Tbilisi government placed integration with the West, especially NATO and the European Union, as top priority.

In 2005, President Mikheil Saakashvili predicted that Georgia would join NATO by 2009. Georgia sought membership in NATO for reasons of both security and its own development as a state. Georgia's Deputy Defence Minister Levan Nikoleishvili stated in an interview in 2006, "We look to Nato as a club and as an organisation, which will not only be a guarantee for security but will also be a guarantee for development for us." Georgia believed that Alliance membership would bring an end to Russian dominance in the region and the Abkhaz and South Ossetian conflicts would be resolved.

Georgia conducted a NATO membership referendum on 5 January 2008. It was a non-binding referendum on whether to join NATO and was held at the request of the Georgian President, together with an early presidential election and legislative election date referendum. This was announced on November 26, 2007, shortly before Mikheil Saakashvili resigned as President of Georgia for the early presidential elections. The referendum asked: "do you want Georgia to become a member of the North Atlantic Treaty Organization, NATO?" According to the official results of Georgia's Central Election Commission, 77% of voters were in favor. On 14 February 2008, at a meeting with NATO Secretary General Jaap de Hoop Scheffer, the head of Georgia's mission to NATO handed him a formal request from President Mikheil Saakashvili to invite Georgia to participate in a Membership Action Plan (MAP).

By the time of the Bucharest summit in April 2008, it was evident that the majority of the European NATO countries were not ready to support the American lead and offer MAP to Ukraine and Georgia, although the US president George W. Bush himself was lobbying both Georgia and Ukraine. The Russian campaign of pressure and threat had likely contributed to that outcome. Germany and France said that offering membership plan to Ukraine and Georgia would be "an unnecessary offense" to Russia. At the summit, the alliance did not offer a MAP to Georgia or Ukraine. The opponents of Ukraine and Georgia pointed out that internal conflicts existed there. However, NATO pledged to review the applications for MAP in December 2008. NATO Secretary General Jaap de Hoop Scheffer said that Georgia and Ukraine would become members eventually. Georgia welcomed the decision and said: "The decision to accept that we are going forward to an adhesion to NATO was taken and we consider this is a historic success".

After the war, the obliteration of Georgia's military power and the heightened insecurity of its borders made some NATO member countries – particularly Western European ones – less willing to extend a membership Action Plan (MAP) to Georgia, and also questioned NATO membership for Ukraine. Some European countries, like Germany and France, were already resisting to the idea of giving a NATO membership assurance to a country with an open dispute with Russia.

Russian woes about potential NATO expansion
Russia's concerns over NATO expansion derive from its Cold War reflexes. Russia continues to view NATO as primarily a military alliance. According to official Russian military doctrine, the presence of foreign forces near Russia's territory, including in the former Soviet space, constitutes a threat. By barring NATO from the South Caucasus, Russia reserves the right to militarily intervene in the region without fear of an allied response under Article 5 of the NATO Charter.

In 2006, the Russian Foreign Ministry stated that the "possible accession of Georgia to an unreformed NATO would seriously affect Russian interests," especially its political, military, and economic interests, and "would have a negative impact on the fragile situation in the Caucasus". As Moscow-based military analyst Pavel Felgenhauer contended, countries such as Poland, the Baltic states, and Georgia all sought to join NATO "to have a guarantee against the Russians." He said that NATO and Russia As Felgenhauer noted, "that makes NATO and Russia basically enemies. In a sense they are on a collision course. So a real partnership is hardly possible and any expansion of NATO is seen, in Russia, in Moscow, as a threat to our interests."

On 4 April 2008, Russian President Putin at the end of the Bucharest summit said that the alliance's plan to invite Georgia and Ukraine "didn’t contribute to trust and predictability in our relations". He also said that expansion of NATO to Russia's borders "would be taken in Russia as a direct threat to the security of our country". On the same day in Bucharest and two days later in Sochi, Vladimir Putin privately told president George Bush that if Ukraine entered NATO, Russia would detach eastern Ukraine (and likely the Crimean Peninsula) and annex them and, thus, Ukraine would "cease to exist as a state". Putin also warned Bush that if Georgia moved toward NATO membership, Russia might recognize Abkhazia and South Ossetia.

In June 2008, Russian President Dmitry Medvedev warned Georgian President Mikheil Saakashvili that the conflict between their two respective states would be deepened if Georgia were to join NATO.

Russian involvement in South Ossetia

On 31 May 2002, Russia adopted the Law on Russian Federation Citizenship, that made obtaining of Russian citizenship by residents of ex-Soviet republics easier. Many residents of Abkhazia and South Ossetia applied for citizenship voluntarily. In 2008, the majority of the residents of South Ossetia were Russian citizens holding Russian passports. According to Russian President Dmitry Medvedev, he would "protect the life and dignity of Russian citizens wherever they are". From the viewpoint of Russian constitutional law, the legal position of Russian passport-holders in South Ossetia is the same as that of Russian citizens living in Russia. According to an EU report, this position is inconsistent with international law (which considers the vast majority of allegedly-naturalised persons as not Russian citizens).

In 2005, Georgia accused Russia of the annexation of its internationally recognized territory. Russian officials had de facto control of South Ossetia's institutions, including security institutions and forces; South Ossetia's de facto government was largely staffed with Russians and South Ossetians with Russian passports, who had occupied equivalent government positions in Russia. Reuters reported that before the war, Russia supplied two-thirds of South Ossetia's annual budget, and that Russia's state-controlled gas giant Gazprom was building new gas pipelines and infrastructure worth of 15 billion Russian rubles there.

In mid-April, 2008, the Russian Foreign Ministry announced that Russian president Vladimir Putin had given instructions to the federal government whereby Russia would pursue economic and administrative relations with Abkhazia and South Ossetia as with the subjects of Russia. In 2008, as Russian pressure increased, Georgia began calling for internationalization of the peacekeeping forces in the separatist regions. Georgia argued that Russia had become a party to the conflict. The West took notice and launched renewed peace efforts. Germany, the EU, and the Organization for Security and Cooperation in Europe (OSCE) all offered revised peace plans or sponsored peace conferences. The German peace plan for Abkhazia was accepted by Georgia but rejected by the Abkhaz separatists. Russia and the separatists failed to appear at an EU-sponsored peace conference on Abkhazia and rejected an OSCE suggestion for renewed negotiations on South Ossetia.

Russian military preparations
On 14 July 2007, Russian president Vladimir Putin issued a decree suspending the application of the Treaty on Conventional Armed Forces in Europe that limits the number of heavy weapons deployed in Europe. The decree would be effective 150 days later. The suspension meant that Russia would no longer allow inspections or exchange data on its deployments.

Russia's defence budget rose 22% in 2007.

Concurrently with the Georgia/USA military exercise Immediate Response 2008, the Russian forces conducted their own exercise, Caucasus 2008, where they practiced rapid response to the terrorist incursions through the Russian southern border. It was reported that the Russian paratroopers would train near the Roksky and Mamison passes. The Roksky pass is the major link with South Ossetia. Both sides claimed that the exercises were unrelated to each other. Later Dale Herspring, an expert on Russian military affairs at Kansas State University, described the Russian exercise as "exactly what they executed in Georgia just a few weeks later [...] a complete dress rehearsal."

Kosovo precedent

In March 2008 Time magazine predicted that "By splitting the West and the wider international community, the U.S.-backed declaration of independence by Kosovo has given Russia an opening. Countries concerned with separatist problems of their own, from Spain or Cyprus to China, have been unable to follow the U.S. lead in recognizing Kosovo's breakaway from Serbia. And Russia has sought to exploit the gaps that have emerged as a result." They went on to say "Russia [...] tacitly supported breakaway provinces [...] Moscow has also granted Russian citizenship to some 90% of the Abkhazian and South Ossetian populations, giving it grounds to intervene whenever Russia deems it expedient, on the basis of ensuring the security of its citizens."

References

Books

Russo-Georgian War
Russo-Georgian War